Yeniköy is a town in Orhangazi district of Bursa Province, Turkey. The population of Yeniköy was 3345  as of 2012. In 1963 Yeniköy was declared a seat of township. Table olive is the most important crop of the town. It was captured by the Greek Army in 1919 and its population was massacred and the village was burnt.

References  

Populated places in Bursa Province
Towns in Turkey
Orhangazi District